The Truckee Meadows Fire Protection District of Washoe County Nevada covers the eastern slopes of the Sierra Nevada Mountains in Western Nevada. The county spans an area of nearly 6,600 square miles in the northwest section of the state bordering California and Oregon. TMFPD was originally founded in 1972 and operated independently until 2001. Washoe County contracted the City of Reno Fire Dept. to operate TMFPD engines until 2012. Early in 2012 the agreement with the City of Reno was terminated and TMFPD was stood back up and operated independently again.  The Truckee Meadows Fire Protection District operates a fire apparatus fleet of 10 engines, 1 ladder company, 11 brush trucks, 1 rescue squad, 1 ambulance, 1 hazardous material unit, various support units, 2 technical rescue support units, 9 water tenders, and 2 water rescue entry vehicles  The District's primary areas of responsibility include rural and suburban communities outside the City of Reno. Truckee Meadows Fire Protection District responded to 10,581 calls for service with a 2017/2018 budget of $27,932,275.

The Truckee Meadows Fire Protection District provides all risk fire and Advanced Life Support level Emergency Medical Services (Paramedic) to unincorporated areas of Washoe County.  The District's emergency response encompasses approximately 214 square miles of territory on the eastern slope of the Carson and Sierra Nevada Mountain range, the second most populated county in the State. The Truckee Meadows Fire Protection District operates 11 career fire stations within Washoe County, Nevada as an "all risk” fire agency capable of responding to structure fires, wildland fires, hazardous materials incidents and emergency medical incidents. The Truckee Meadows Fire Protection District  is a first response unit, deploying first line fire control and or initiating rescue operations and providing advanced life support for emergency medical calls throughout the county. Based on the resources and capabilities of the Truckee Meadows Fire Protection District, the Insurance Services Organization (ISO) has rated them as a Class 3/10 department. The Truckee Meadows Fire Protection District also assists other fire protection agencies within the County, and at the border of Nevada and California.

The Demographics of  Washoe County covers 6,540.4 square miles. There are approximately 42,154 households in the unincorporated areas with an estimated population of 419,948. The average household size in 2007 was estimated at 2.70.  With the rapid population growth and urban development within the county, the department assist in the education and understanding of fire ecology and exposure to risk for its residents.

Mutual aid

Mutual aid is the assistance from one fire department to another when specific equipment has been requested after the initial dispatch to an emergency incident.  The Truckee Meadows Fire Protection District merged with the Sierra Fire Protection District and has mutual aid or automatic aid agreements with the following agencies:

Agencies
 Sparks Fire Department
 Reno Fire Department
 North lake Tahoe Fire Protection District
 Nevada Division of Forestry
 Nevada Air National Guard
 United States Forest Service
 Bureau of Land Management
 Carson City Fire Department
 Tahoe Regional Fire Chiefs
 Storey County Fire
 Sierra County Fire (California)
 Cal Fire

Training within these specialties include
 Flood Hazard
 Water Rescue Scenarios
 Hazardous Materials
 Wildland Fire and fires in the Wildland/Urban Interface
 Risk Assessment
 Paramedic Advanced Life Support

District stations
Battalion-30
 Station 30     3905 Old Hwy 395, Washoe Valley
Engine-30
Brush-30
Tender-30
Medic-30
 Station 32     1240 East Lake Blvd., Washoe Valley
Engine-32
Brush-32
Tender-32
Boat-32
 Station 33     470 Foothill Rd., Reno
Engine-33
Ladder-33
Brush-33
Tender-33
 Station 35     10201 W. 4th St., Mogul
Changed to station 40 
 Station 36     13500 Thomas Creek Rd., Reno
Engine-36
Brush-36
Tender-36
 Station 37     3255 Hidden Valley Dr., Reno
Engine-37
Brush-37
Tender-37
 Station 39     4000 Joy Lake Rd., Reno
Engine-39
Brush-39
Tender-39

Battalion-40
 Station 40
Engine-40
Brush-40
Tender-40
 Station 42     3680 Diamond Peak Dr., Reno, NV
Engine-42
Brush-42
Tender-42
 Station 44     10575 Silver Lake Blvd., Stead
Engine-44
Brush-44
Tender-44
 Station 45     110 Quartz Lane, Sun Valley
Engine-45
Brush-45
Tender-45
Medic-45
 Station 46     500 Rockwell Blvd., Spanish Springs
Engine-46
Brush-46
Tender-46
Medic-46

References

Firefighting in Nevada
Washoe County, Nevada
Fire protection districts in the United States
1972 establishments in Nevada
Government agencies established in 1972
Government of Nevada